The New Development Bank (NDB), formerly referred to as the BRICS Development Bank, is a multilateral development bank established by the BRICS states (Brazil, Russia, India, China and South Africa). According to the Agreement on the NDB, "the Bank shall support public or private projects through loans, guarantees, equity participation and other financial instruments." Moreover, the NDB "shall cooperate with international organizations and other financial entities, and provide technical assistance for projects to be supported by the Bank."

The initial authorized capital of the bank is $100 billion divided into 1 million shares having a par value of $100,000 each. The initial subscribed capital of the NDB is $50 billion divided into paid-in shares ($10 billion) and callable shares ($40 billion). The initial subscribed capital of the bank was equally distributed among the founding members (Brazil, Russia, India, People’s Republic of China, South Africa). The Agreement on the NDB specifies that every member will have one vote and that no member would have any veto powers
.

The bank is headquartered in Shanghai, China. The first regional office of the NDB is in Johannesburg, South Africa. The second regional office was established in 2019 in São Paulo, Brazil, followed by GIFT City, India and Moscow, Russia.

History
The idea for setting up the bank was proposed by India at the 4th BRICS summit in 2012 held in Delhi. The creation of a new development bank was the main theme of the meeting. BRICS leaders agreed to set up a Development bank at the 5th BRICS summit held in Durban, South Africa on 27 March 2013.

On 15 July 2014, the first day of the 6th BRICS summit held in Fortaleza, Brazil, the BRICS states signed the Agreement on the New Development Bank, which makes provisions for the legal basis of the bank. In a separate agreement, a reserve currency pool worth $100 billion was set up by BRICS nations.

On 11 May 2015, K. V. Kamath was appointed as the President of the bank.

The 7th BRICS summit in July 2015 marked the entry into force of the Agreement on the New Development Bank.

On 27 February 2016, the NDB signed Headquarters Agreement with the Government of the P.R.C. and the Memorandum of Understanding with Shanghai Municipal People's Government concerning the arrangements in relation to Headquarters of the bank in Shanghai.

According to the bank, most of the NDB policies and procedures for all functional areas were approved at the Board of Directors meeting in January 2016.

On 19 July 2016, the NDB reported that it successfully issued the bank's first green financial bond with issue size of RMB 3 billion, tenor of 5 years in the China interbank bond market.

On 20 July 2016, the first annual meeting of the NDB Board of Governors was held in Shanghai. The participants of the meeting discussed Bank's future work and development and gave a positive assessment to the bank's work. At the meeting, the first green financial bond issuance in Renminbi was highlighted as a milestone event for the NDB.

In 2016, the NDB Board of Directors approved the first set of projects in all members of the bank.

On 21 December 2016, the NDB signed its first loan agreement.

The NDB received  AA+ credit ratings from S&P Global Ratings (S&P) and Fitch Ratings (Fitch) in August 2018, which enables the bank to offer full suite of financial products to its public and private sector clients.

As of March 2019, The bank announced to issue loans of up to $40 billion by 2022 in South Africa.

In April 2020, the New Development Bank established an Emergency Assistance Facility that sought to finance costs related to the fight against the Coronavirus and soften the blow from the economic impact. In addition to committing 5 billion USD to this cause, the NDB targeted to provide up to 10 billion dollars.

On March 3, 2022, in response to the Russia-Ukraine War, the New Development Bank announced that it put new transactions with Russia on hold. Even though the NDB quickly cut ties with Russia, Fitch Ratings still downgraded the NDB from stable to negative on its Long-Term Issuer Default scale.

In May 2022, the New Development Bank set up a regional office in India in the state of Gujarat with the goal of financing and observing infrastructure projects in both India and Bangladesh.

Structure and Objectives

Corporate Governance

According to the Articles of Agreement, the main organs of the bank are:
Board of Governors
Board of Directors
President and Vice-Presidents

Information about the composition of the NDB Board of Governors is available on the Bank's official website.

The NDB President is elected on a rotational basis from one of the founding members, and there are four Vice Presidents from each of the other four founding members.

K. V. Kamath, from India, is the first elected president of the NDB. He was replaced as president by Marcos Prado Troyjo from Brazil since 7 July 2020. Marcos Troyjo was elected president of the New Development Bank on 27 May 2020.

Capital

The New Development Bank has an initial subscribed capital of US$50 billion and an initial authorized capital of US$100 billion. The initial subscribed capital is equally distributed among the founding members. The payment of the amount initially subscribed by each founding member to the paid-in capital stock of the Bank will made in dollars in 7 installments. Each member cannot increase its share of capital without all other four members agreeing. The bank will allow new members to join but the BRICS capital share cannot fall below 55%.

Objectives 
The bank aims to contribute to the development plans established nationally through projects that are socially, environmentally and economically sustainable. Taking this into account, the main objectives of the NDB can be summarized as follows
 Promote infrastructure and sustainable development projects with a significant development impact in member countries.
 Establish an extensive network of global partnerships with other multilateral development institutions and national development banks.
 Build a balanced project portfolio giving a proper respect to their geographic location, financing requirements and other factors.

Membership
The Agreement on the New Development Bank entered into force in July 2015, with the official declaration of all five states that have signed it. The five founding members of the Bank include Brazil, Russia, India, China and South Africa.

Bank's Articles of Agreement specify that all members of the United Nations could be members of the bank, however the share of the BRICS nations can never be less than 55% of voting power.

Expanding the NDB's membership is considered by some experts to be crucial to its long-term development by helping boost the bank's business growth.

According to the Bank's General Strategy: 2017–2021, the NDB plans to expand membership gradually so as not to overly strain its operational and decision-making capacity.

In September 2021, Bangladesh, the United Arab Emirates and Uruguay joined the NDB.

In December 2021, the NDB admitted Egypt as a new member.

Shareholding structure

According to Articles of Agreement of the New Development Bank, the initial authorized capital of the bank is divided into 1 million shares, having a par value of $100,000. Each founding member of the bank has initially subscribed 100,000 shares, in a total of $10 billion, of which 20,000 shares correspond to paid-in capital, in a total of $2 billion and 80,000 shares correspond to callable capital, in a total of $8 billion.

The current distribution of shares between NDB member countries is presented in the following table.

Activities

Projects 
According to the Bank's General Strategy, sustainable infrastructure development is at the core of NDB's operational strategy in 2017–2021, and the Bank will dedicate about two-thirds of financing commitments in its first five years to this area.

The New Development Bank is planning to give a priority to projects aimed at developing renewable energy sources.  As it was stated by the Bank, it wants to cooperate with other institutions in accelerating ‘green’ financing expansion and promoting environment protection.

The NDB has expressed interest in funding projects that conform to high environmental standards, including those in the field of infrastructure, such as energy, railways and highways in the future. At the same time, according to K. V. Kamath, the NDB President, one of the key strategies of the bank will be financing profitable projects (bankable) with return on capital. The NDB wants "to fund projects that are creative and bring benefits to the local people and environment", said Vice President Zhu Xian.

The leadership of the member countries task the bank with developing a strong pipeline of projects and responding in a fast and flexible manner to aspirations and interests of its members.

As of 6 March 2019, the NDB Board of Directors approved 30 projects with loans aggregating over approx. USD 8 billion.

The Bank has begun non-sovereign operations with loans approved in Brazil, South Africa, and Russia.

Bonds 
In March 2016, the NDB announced that it will do a bond issue in China to raise funding domestically on the Chinese market. The bond issue is likely to happen in the second quarter of the year 2016, said the NDB Vice President Leslie Maasdorp. He added the bank is starting to finalize the exact size of this bond issue.

On 18 July 2016 the NDB successfully issued its first green financial bond with issue size of RMB 3 billion, tenor of 5 years in China onshore interbank bond market. The bond's nominal interest rate is 3.07%. The bank became the first international financial institution that issued a green financial bond in the China onshore bond market. The proceeds of the bond will be used for infrastructure and sustainable development projects in the member countries.

In February 2019, the bank  successfully placed CNY 3 billion RMB-denominated bond in the China Interbank Bond Market, and it was priced at the lower end of announced pricing range.

On May 18, 2022, the New Development Bank issued a 7 billion RMB - 3 year bond into the Chinese Interbank Bond Market(CIMB), making it the largest bond ever made by foreign issuers. It received an Issuer Rating(IR) of AA+ from both S&P and Fitch.

Relations with other institutions

Approach 
The Articles of Agreement of the bank say that the NDB was established to complement the existing efforts of multilateral and regional financial institutions for global growth and development. Moreover, the NDB is authorized by its founders to cooperate within its mandate with other international organizations, as well as national entities (public or private), in particular with international financial institutions and national development banks.

The NDB President K.V.Kamath stresses that the bank regards other international financial institutions, including IMF and World Bank as partners, not rivals.

Asian Development Bank 
In July 2016, the NDB signed with Asian Development Bank (ADB) a  memorandum of understanding on strategic cooperation. The two institutions expressed willingness to work together through co-financing and knowledge exchanges in areas including sustainable development projects in renewable energy, energy efficiency, clean transportation, sustainable water management, and sewage treatment.

Asian Infrastructure Investment Bank 
Although some analysts hypothesise that the Asian Infrastructure Investment Bank (AIIB) and the NDB would compete with one another, currently there is no evidence of competition among these institutions.

Talking about the relations with AIIB, officials from the NDB's member states point out the difference in the member states of the NDB and AIIB as well as a potential to complement in working together to meet development and infrastructural needs.

According to a representative of the Bank's management, the NDB and AIIB are sister institutions in many respects. These two banks have complementary mandates and different geographic focuses, with the NDB being more focused on BRICS countries. At the same time, there is a certain overlapping between mandates of the NDB and the AIIB, as both of them are aimed at developing infrastructure and pay a special attention to sustainable development. However, due to the fact that current financing and investment patterns are inadequate in meeting investment needs, there is "space for newcomers", he said.

In February 2016, the president of the NDB dismissed concerns over overlapping of interests of China-backed AIIB and the NDB.

World Bank 
According to media reports, other multilateral development institutions, including the World Bank Group (WBG), have expressed an intention to work together with the NDB.

In September 2016, NDB and World Bank Group signed a memorandum of understanding on cooperation and it was announced that the NDB and WBG's cooperative efforts will focus primarily on infrastructure.

Partnerships and cooperation agreements

Multilateral development banks 

 World Bank
 Inter-American Development Bank (IDB)
 Financial Fund for the Development of the River Plate Basin (FONPLATA)
 European Bank for Reconstruction and Development (EBRD)
 Asian Infrastructure Investment Bank (AIIB)
 Caribbean Development Bank (CDB)
 Eurasian Development Bank (EDB)
 International Investment Bank (IIB)
 Development Bank of Latin America (CAF)
Asian Development Bank (ADB)
Islamic Development Bank (IsDB)
European Investment Bank (EIB)

National development banks 

 Development Bank of Southern Africa (DBSA)
Agricultural Development Bank of China (ADBC)
Exim Bank of China
 China Development Bank (CDB)
 Brazilian National Bank for Economic and Social Development (BNDES)

Reception

Prominent scholars 
In July 2014, Nobel Prize winning economist Joseph Stiglitz said the NDB marks a "fundamental change in global economic and political power." In his opinion, "The existing institutions just don't have enough resources."

In the analysis of academic Suisheng Zhao, China's role in the creation of the NBD is "a symbolic gesture to create a sort of IMF clone writ small toward reshaping the Western-dominated international financial architecture."

Officials 
Chinese Premier Li Keqiang called the opening of the NDB an "important step forward" in cooperation among BRICS countries. "This is great progress in financial cooperation among developing countries and emerging economies, as well as a helpful supplement to the global financial system," Li Keqiang said at a meeting with K. V. Kamath in Beijing in July, 2015.

China Finance Minister Lou Jiwei said that the establishment of the NDB and the Beijing-led AIIB would encourage existing multilateral institutions to do better. At a news conference at the conclusion of the G20 meeting of finance ministers and central bank governors in Shanghai he added that the New Development Bank could help drive aggregate global demand.

Bankers 
8 July 2015, VTB CEO Andrey Kostin said that the NDB is "important because it's a first institution created by the BRICS countries." "Actually we are talking about the institutionalization of the BRICS process, and that's quite important I think. It's a permanent working instrument which will be working every day and which will be in the heart of BRICS cooperation," he added.

According to former Reserve Bank of India governor Raghuram Rajan, the NDB "Is a co-operative effort between all BRICS countries." "We have already reached contingency reserve agreement (CRA). This is second. Let's see how it develops. Lots of hopes embedded in it for greater cooperation (among the) BRICS countries," he told reporters in February 2016.

Logo and identity 

The logo of the New Development Bank borrows from the mathematical concept of a Mobius strip that symbolizes the idea of continuous transformation. Its nature is not to disrupt but drive change in the existing system from within.

The logo consists of a triangle in motion at one end signifying balanced evolution. The other end, moving in the opposite direction, is a propeller that represents speed and dynamism. These two entities are held together by a wireframe, the skeletal basic of infrastructure. The logo is rendered in gradient of green that symbolizes sustainability. This constant motion symbolizes the values that the bank strives to live by – agility, innovation and continuous transformation.

See also

 BRICS Contingent Reserve Arrangement
 Asian Infrastructure Investment Bank

References

External links
 
 Newsroom section on the official website of the New Development Bank
 

D
International finance institutions
Multilateral development banks
Banking institutes
Supranational banks
International banking institutions
International development organizations
Intergovernmental organizations established by treaty
Banks based in Shanghai
Organizations established in 2015